The Moon Will Rise Again is the second album by Mississippi band The Cooters. It was produced and recorded by Rick Clark in October 1998 at Ardent Studios in Memphis, Tennessee.

The album's release was delayed for some time after drummer Judas Cooter was incarcerated at the Mississippi State Penitentiary at Parchman in 1999, and The Cooters were involved in a trademark dispute over their name.

After all the legal hurdles were cleared, Grammy-nominated producer Tim Ramenofsky picked the album up in 2002 and released it on his T-Bones Records label alongside artists Afroman, Loppybogymi, and the Dukes of Jazzard.

Track listing 
Unless otherwise noted, all songs by Newt Rayburn, Gentry Webb, and Mike Namorato.
 "Cootersaurus" - 2:22
 Newt Rayburn on bass; Gentry Webb on lead guitar; Mike Namorato on drums.
 "Purge" - 4:23
 Newt Rayburn on bass, vocals, moog; Gentry Webb on lead guitar; Mike Namorato on drums.
 "Purge Reprise" - Purge Reprise 3:06
 Newt Rayburn on bass, vocals; Gentry Webb on lead guitar; Mike Namorato on drums.
 "Soul Food" - 6:22
 Newt Rayburn on bass, vocals; Gentry Webb on lead guitar, acoustic guitar, tenor saxophone; Mike Namorato on drums, alto saxophone; Jim Spake on baritone saxophone.
 "Dare To Defy" - 6:34
 Newt Rayburn on bass, vocals; Gentry Webb on lead guitar; Mike Namorato on drums.
 "Punch Yer Neighbor" - 3:34
 Newt Rayburn on bass; Gentry Webb on lead guitar, vocals; Mike Namorato on drums.
 "Unclaimed Furniture" - 3:22
 Brad Boatright made the prank phone call; Newt Rayburn edited it.
 "The Cooters Theme Song" - 5:17
 Newt Rayburn on bass, vocals; Gentry Webb on lead guitar, acoustic guitar; Mike Namorato on drums.
 "Amen" - 0:19
 Newt Rayburn on bass, vocals; Gentry Webb on lead guitar, vocals; Mike Namorato on drums, vocals.

Personnel 
 Newt Rayburn (aka Neuter Cooter) - bass, vocals
 Gentry Webb (aka Raw Cooter) - lead guitar, acoustic guitar, tenor saxophone
 Mike Namorato (aka Judas Cooter) - drums, alto saxophone
 Jim Spake - baritone saxophone
 Brad Boatright - prank phone call

Production 
 Rick Clark - Producer
 Newt Rayburn - Producer, Art Director
 Skidd Mills - Engineer

References 

The Cooters albums
2002 albums